Parkdale is a suburb in Melbourne, Victoria, Australia, 23 km south-east of Melbourne's Central Business District, located within the City of Kingston local government area.

It is situated between the suburbs of Mentone and Mordialloc, and is located on the Frankston railway line.

Parkdale was founded in 1920, and named for early homesteader William Parker when engineers decided to build a railway station alongside a cluster of five bayside shops. Parkdale Post Office opened on 6 January 1921.

Parkdale's local library, Kingston Library, is located on Parkers Road adjacent to Parkdale station. Parkdale is also a noted beach-side suburb. The beach is a 750-metre walk from the station.

Education
 Parkdale Primary School 
 Parkdale Secondary College
 Parktone Primary School
 St. John Vianney's Primary School

Politics

In terms of State and Federal Government Parkdale has since 2014 been represented by the Member for the Electoral district of Mordialloc, Tim Richardson in state parliament and in federal parliament by Mark Dreyfus, the Member for the Electoral district of Isaacs since 2007.

Transport

Parkdale is accessible by a number of Public Transport Victoria bus routes servicing the area. The 903 bus service from Mordialloc passes through Parkdale along Beach Road. The 708 bus from Carrum to Hampton station stops at Parkdale railway station. This train line services the area via Parkdale Station, located on the Frankston line, operating in Zone 2.

On 29 July 2021, the Andrews Labor Government announced they will be removing the Parkdale/Mentone Warrigal Road and Parkers Road level crossings, with the preferred solution to build a rail bridge over the road between Mentone and Parkdale. These works are due to be completed by 2025.

Demographics

11,185 people live in Parkdale according to the 2011 Australian census with 75.58% listing themselves as being born in Australia. Australia is the most common birthplace for people living in Parkdale, followed by 6.04% who list themselves as UK born. Other countries of birth include New Zealand (1.59%), Greece (0.89%), Italy (0.75%), China (0.73%) and India (0.72%).

By ancestry most people living in Parkdale are of English descent with 62.79% of respondents listing English ancestry in the 2011 Australia census. Other common ancestries listed include Irish (14.16%), Scottish (10.36%), Italian (5.18%), German (3.67%), Greek (3.35%) and Chinese (1.67%). 34.99% of respondents listed their ancestry as 'Australian'.

Notable people with a connection to the Suburb

 Steven King - Melbourne Cup winning jockey
 Rick Springfield - Singer/Actor. His mother still resides in Parkdale
 Rex Hunt - Former AFL Player/Commentator. Born in neighbouring Mentone, played football for Parkdale.
 Scott Boland - Australian fast bowler. Played for the Parkdale Cricket Club.
 Nicole Livingstone - Olympian. Attended Parkdale Secondary College.

See also
 City of Mordialloc – Parkdale was previously within this former local government area.

Notes

References

Suburbs of Melbourne
Suburbs of the City of Kingston (Victoria)
1920 establishments in Australia
Port Phillip